The Prince of Pappenheim (German: Der Fürst von Pappenheim) is a 1927 German silent comedy film directed by Richard Eichberg and starring Mona Maris, Curt Bois and Dina Gralla. Bois' character of an ambitious young man was closely modelled on the early film appearances of Ernst Lubitsch. It was shot at the Babelsberg Studios and on location in Baden-Baden. The film's art direction was by Jacek Rotmil. It premiered at the Gloria-Palast in Berlin.

Cast
 Mona Maris as Prinzessin Antoinette 
 Curt Bois as Egon Fürst 
 Dina Gralla as Diana, genannt Diddi 
 Lydia Potechina as Camilla Pappenheim, Inhaberin des Modesalons 
 Hans Junkermann as Fürst Ottokar, Antoinettes Vater 
 Werner Fuetterer as Sascha, Prinz von Gorgonien 
 Gyula Szőreghy as Graf Katschkoff 
 Albert Paulig as Adjutant des Prinzen

References

Bibliography
 Prawer, S.S. Between Two Worlds: The Jewish Presence in German and Austrian Film, 1910-1933. Berghahn Books, 2005.

External links

1927 films
Films of the Weimar Republic
1927 comedy films
German comedy films
German silent feature films
Films directed by Richard Eichberg
Films based on operettas
UFA GmbH films
German black-and-white films
Silent comedy films
Films shot at Babelsberg Studios
1920s German films